Podolski (Polish feminine: Podolska, plural: Podolscy), is a Slavic surname found mostly in Poland and Ukraine. It refers to the historical region of Podolia, located in present-day Ukraine.

People with the surname Podolski
Dariusz Podolski, Polish football player
Lukas Podolski (born 1985), Poland-born German football player
Łukasz Podolski (born 1980), Polish professional road cyclist
Sophie Podolski (1953–1974), Belgian poet and graphic artist
Waldemar Podolski, Polish football player

Related forms
Podolak (Ukrainian: Подоляк)
Podolec (Ukrainian: Подолець)
Podolan (Ukrainian: Подолян)
Podilchak/Podilczak ((Ukrainian: Подільчак)
Podilchuk/Podilczuk ((Ukrainian: Подольчук)
Podolchak/Podolczak ((Ukrainian: Подольчак)
Podolchuk/Podolczuk (Ukrainian: Подольчук)
Podolczyk ((Ukrainian: Подольчик)
Podolcsák (Hungarian version of the Polish Podolczak)
Podilchyk/Podilczyk ((Ukrainian: Подольчик)

Polish-language surnames
Ukrainian-language surnames
Surnames